Wasa Lake is a lake in British Columbia, Canada. It has an area of 1.1473 km2. It is 37.5 km north of Cranbrook.  Wasa Lake Provincial Park sits at the northern end of the lake. It was named in 1902 after the city Vaasa in Finland. It was formerly known as 'Hanson lake'.

There is an 8 km wheelchair and bike accessible "Wasa Lions Way" trail around the lakeshore as well as a 2.7 km "Forest of the Rainshadow" self-guided interpretive trail that begins at the amphitheatre located in the Wasa Lake campground. This family friendly trail leads up to the Wasa Lake Ridge which overlooks the lake, the Purcell Mountains, the Kimberley ski hill and has a breathtaking backdrop of the Rocky Mountains.

The lake is reported to be the "warmest lake in the Kootenays" with many popular beaches run by BC Parks. Tourists visit Wasa Lake in the summer for waterskiing, swimming, wind surfing, and fishing. Perch, Pumpkinseed Sunfish and Largemouth bass fishing are available in this freshwater lake.

References 

Lakes of British Columbia
East Kootenay
Kootenay Land District